Seth Sethsen (born 26 May 1955 as Helge Seth Nielsen) is a Danish-Greenlandic murderer, who was sentenced to life imprisonment in 1986 by the Østre Landsret for the murder of 49-year-old taxi driver Kurt Gaarn-Larsen on 19 October 1985 on Gamle Landevej in Albertslund.

Notes

1955 births
Living people
20th-century Danish criminals
Danish male criminals
Danish people convicted of murder
Danish prisoners sentenced to life imprisonment
People convicted of murder by Denmark
Prisoners sentenced to life imprisonment by Denmark